The 1927 Liga was the 7th edition of the Polish Football Championship (6th completed season ended with the selection of a winner) and the 1st season of the Liga (now Ekstraklasa), the top Polish professional league for association football clubs. The league was operated by the Polska Liga Piłki Nożnej (PLPN). The champions were Wisła Kraków, who won their 1st Polish title.

Competition modus
The season started on 3 April 1927 and concluded on 13 November 1927 (spring-autumn league). The season was played as a round-robin tournament. The team at the top of the standings won the league title. A total of 14 teams participated. Each team played a total of 26 matches, half at home and half away, two games against each other team. Teams received two points for a win and one point for a draw.

League table

Results

Top goalscorers

References

Bibliography

External links
 Poland Final Tables 1927 at RSSSF 
 Poland 1927 Liga polska at wildstat.com 
 Liga 1927 at 90minut.pl 
 Liga 1927 at wikiliga.pl 
 Sezon 1927 at hppn.pl 

Ekstraklasa seasons
1
Pol
Pol